Man Vrouw Maatschappij (MVM, "Man Woman Society") was a Dutch feminist action group, founded by Joke Smit en Hedy d'Ancona.

The group was founded by Joke Smit in October 1968; she had published the feminist article "Het onbehagen bij de vrouw" ("The Discontent of Women") in November 1967. After Dolle Mina, another feminist group, was founded it sailed a more radical course and participated in feminist actions, most notably 1970's Op de vrouw af!. MVM was anti-hierarchical and opposed to patriarchy; it was run without a president and after 1973 disallowed men, causing d'Ancona and others to leave the group.

References
 J. Doomen over Ribberink A., Leidsvrouwen en zaakwaarneemsters, Een geschiedenis van de aktiegroep Man Vrouw Maatschappij 1968-1973 

Feminist organisations in the Netherlands